The Tribune-Republic Building (also known as the Laughery House Annex or as the Shaw House) is a historic building located at 1763 Santa Barbara Street in San Luis Obispo, California.

Description and history 
It was built in 1873 and was moved in 1905.
It is significant as the only surviving newspaper printing office in San Luis Obispo from its era, during 1873 to 1890, when four newspapers competed there.

It was listed on the National Register of Historic Places on June 24, 1993.

See also 
 City of San Luis Obispo Historic Resources

References 

Buildings and structures in San Luis Obispo, California
Commercial buildings completed in 1873
Commercial buildings on the National Register of Historic Places in California
National Register of Historic Places in San Luis Obispo County, California
Victorian architecture in California
Newspaper headquarters in the United States